Women's Democratic Party ( or DSŽ) is a women's rights political organization founded in Zagreb in 2004. Party aims to represent the interests and concerns of women. The party allows male members.

Sources
 

Political parties established in 2004
Political parties in Croatia
2004 establishments in Croatia
Feminist parties in Europe